Halieutopsis murrayi, also known as Murray's deepsea batfish, is a species of fish in the family Ogcocephalidae.

It is found in the waters of the Gulf of Aden.

Etymology
The species is named after Sir John Murray (1841–1914) in recognition of his contributions to modern oceanography and with reference to the John Murray Expedition, during which the holotype was collected.

References

Ogcocephalidae
Marine fish genera
Fish described in 2022
Taxa named by Hans Hsuan-Ching Ho